Cedric Warren Dempsey (born April 14, 1932) is a sports administrator who became the third executive director of the National Collegiate Athletic Association (NCAA) from 1994 to 2003. Before leaving the post in 2002, Dempsey restructured the organization, cracked down on gambling in college sports, emphasized financial responsibility and negotiated major television contracts with ESPN and CBS.

Dempsey served as the athletic director at the University of the Pacific (1967–1979), San Diego State University (1979), University of Houston (1979–1982) and the University of Arizona (1983–1993). Dempsey's tenure at Arizona was noted for raising the university's national prominence in NCAA sports, particularly in basketball, football, softball and golf.  He also served as Commissioner of the All American Football League (2007–2010).

References

1932 births
Living people
Albion Britons baseball players
Albion Britons football players
Albion Britons men's basketball coaches
Albion Britons men's basketball players
American men's basketball players
Arizona Wildcats athletic directors
College cross country coaches in the United States
Houston Cougars athletic directors
National Collegiate Athletic Association people
Pacific Tigers athletic directors
People from Gallatin County, Illinois
San Diego State Aztecs athletic directors